The men's singles table tennis event was part of the table tennis programme at the 2020 Summer Olympics in Tokyo. The event took place from 24 July to 30 July 2021 at Tokyo Metropolitan Gymnasium.

Qualification

Schedule

Seeds
The top 16 seeded players qualified directly to the third round.

  (Final, silver medalist)
  (champion, gold medalist)
  (fourth round)
  (quarterfinals)
  (Semifinals, fourth place)
  (third round)
  (Semifinals, bronze medalist)
  (fourth round)
  (fourth round)
  (quarterfinals)
  (third round)
  (fourth round)
  (third round)
  (fourth round)
  (third round)
  (fourth round)

The players seeded from 17 to 32 qualified directly to the second round.

  (second round)
  (quarterfinals)
  (fourth round)
  (third round)
  (second round)
  (third round)
  (second round)
  (third round)
  (fourth round)
  (second round)
  (third round)
  (quarterfinals)
  (third round)
  (third round)
  (second round)
  (third round)

Draw

Finals

Top half

Section 1

Section 2

Bottom half

Section 3

Section 4

Preliminary rounds

Top half

Section 1

Section 2

Bottom half

Section 3

Section 4

References

External links
 Results Books : Tokyo 2020. The Tokyo Organising Committee of the Olympic and Paralympic Games. (2021).
 Tokyo 2020 Olympic Games. ITTF
 2020 Summer Olympics / Table Tennis / Singles, Men. Olympedia.org

Men's singles
Men's events at the 2020 Summer Olympics